Ikejiri (池尻) is a Japanese surname. Notable people with the surname include:

, Japanese footballer
, Japanese physician and writer

See also
Ikejiri Station, a railway station in Kawasaki, Fukuoka Prefecture, Japan

Japanese-language surnames